Free Love and Other Stories is a short story collection by Scottish Booker-shortlisted author Ali Smith, first published in 1995 by Virago Press. It was her first published book and won the Saltire First Book of the Year award. and a Scottish Arts Council award It contains twelve short stories.

"A Sweetly memorable collection" - The Times

Cover
Ali Smith chose the cover of the first edition, a picture of Louise Brooks from the G. W. Pabst film Diary of a Lost Girl (1929). The cover also includes a quote from Irish writer Bernard MacLaverty: "What a great bunch of stories".

Stories
"Free Love" : A teenage girl finds unexpected sexual freedom on a trip to Amsterdam...
"A story of folding and unfolding" : A father unpacks his dead wife's underwear and is reminded of his first contact with her as an electrician rewiring a WAF dormitory...
"Text for the day" : Melissa disappears and her concerned friend Austen discovers that nothing in her flat has been touched except her large book collection (from Agee to Yevtushenko) which lies scattered in a state of disarray.  Melissa is soon in touch and asks Austen to send her a selection of her books annually as she is travelling the world, re-reading and distributing the pages as she goes...
"A quick one" : A girl waits to meet her ex in a cafe and reminisces over the relationship...
"Jenny Robertson your friend is not coming" : A girl has a meal with her friend Elizabeth in a restaurant in the Grassmarket before going to watch a film...
"To the cinema" : A Sunday morning cinema usher describes her favourite films, the loss of her faith and her relationship with her boyfriend Geoff. Meanwhile a regular in the audience is secretly obsessed with her...
"The touching of wood" : A girl describes a visit to the Greek island Spinalonga with her girlfriend...
"Cold Iron : Anne McGregor has fond memories of her mother who has recently died...
"College" : Following the death of her elder sister Gillian, Alex and her parents travel to her Cambridge College for the dedication of a bench in her honour. Afterwards her family plan a day in Kent but Alex hitches a ride in a lorry to Brighton instead...
"Scary" : Linda travels with her boyfriend Tom to spend a night at his ex-girlfriend Zoe and her new partner Richard's. When the arrive they discover their host's scary obsession with River Phoenix...
"The unthinkable happens to people every day" : In which a man suffers a nervous breakdown and drives to Scotland where he meets a young girl skimming stones by the edge of a loch...
"The world with love" : A girl meets an old school friend and remembers when their French teacher 'went mad'...

References in the book

Books mentioned in "Text for the day"
Villette and Shirley by Charlotte Brontë
Testament of Youth by Vera Brittain
Seeing Things by Seamus Heaney
Tender is the Night by F. Scott Fitzgerald
Bliss by Peter Carey
The Novel Today by Malcolm Bradbury
Madame Bovary by Gustave Flaubert
Selected Dramas and Lyrics of Ben Johnson
Memoirs of a Dutiful Daughter by Simone de Beauvoir
Dubliners by James Joyce
The Sunday Missal and Prayer Book
Mornings in Mexico by D. H. Lawrence

Films mentioned in "To the cinema"
The Birth of a Nation (1915)
Pandora's Box (1929, starring Louise Brooks)
Beauty Prize (1930, starring Louise Brooks)
The Wizard of Oz (1939)
Les Enfants du Paradis (1945)
Rashomon (1950)
The Seventh Seal (1957)
North by Northwest (1959)
A Bout de Souffle (1960)
Barbarella (1968)
Taxi Driver (1976)
Betty Blue (1986)
Beauty and the Beast (1991)
Reservoir Dogs (1992)

Other prominent references
Crazy by Patsy Cline features in "A Quick One"
Queen Christina (a 1933 film starring Greta Garbo) features in "Jenny Robertson your friend is not coming"

External links
My first book -- A literary adventure from The Times 11 Dec 2004

References

1995 short story collections
Scottish short story collections
Debut books
Virago Press books